The Peugeot Type 118 is a motor car produced by the French auto-maker Peugeot at their Audincourt plant in 1909. 150 were produced.

The car shared with its 1908 predecessor, the Peugeot Type 108, a front-mounted twin-cylinder engine of 1,527 cc delivering a maximum of 10 hp to the rear wheels by means of a rotating steel drive shaft.

The 2,455 mm wheelbase, very slightly shorter than that of the Type 108, supported body formats which included a “Droschke” with space for four.

Sources and further reading 
 Wolfgang Schmarbeck: Alle Peugeot Automobile 1890-1990. Motorbuch-Verlag. Stuttgart 1990. 

Type 118
Cars introduced in 1909
1900s cars
Brass Era vehicles

it:Peugeot Type 63, 99, 108 e 118